Sunset Lake is a lake in the U.S. state of Wisconsin.

Sunset Lake was named in the 1920s.

References

Lakes of Wisconsin
Bodies of water of Portage County, Wisconsin